Old-Age Insurance (Industry, etc.) Convention, 1933 (shelved) is  an International Labour Organization Convention.

It was established in 1933:
Having decided upon the adoption of certain proposals with regard to compulsory old-age insurance,...

Modification 
The concepts contained in the convention were revised and included in ILO Convention C128, Invalidity, Old-Age and Survivors' Benefits Convention, 1967.

Ratifications
Prior to it being shelved, the convention was ratified by 11 states.

External links 
Text.
Ratifications.

Shelved International Labour Organization conventions
Social security
Treaties concluded in 1933
Treaties entered into force in 1937